The forty-fourth Connecticut House of Representatives district elects one member of the Connecticut House of Representatives. Its current representative is Republican Anne Dauphinais. The district consists of parts of the towns of Killingly and Plainfield. The district's boundaries were radically changed in 2001: prior to the boundary change, the district contained the entire towns of Canterbury and the entirety Plainfield, as well as part of Killingly.

List of representatives

Recent elections

External links 
 Google Maps - Connecticut House Districts

References

44th